Jillian Alexander-Brower (2 April 1968 - 25 October 2004) was a Canadian professional tennis player.

Alexander was Jamaican by birth, but raised in Oakville, Ontario from the age of nine. She played college tennis for the University of Florida and won the 1991 NCAA Division I doubles championship with Nicole Arendt.

On the professional tour she reached a career best singles ranking of 303 in the world and had a best doubles ranking of 243. She made several appearance at her home WTA Tour tournament, the Canadian Open, then in 1991 partnered college teammate Nicole Arendt in the main draw of the US Open.

Following her tennis career she remained in Florida and died of ovarian cancer in 2004 at the age of 36.

ITF finals

Singles: 2 (0–2)

Doubles: 6 (3–3)

References

External links
 
 

1968 births
2004 deaths
Canadian female tennis players
Florida Gators women's tennis players
Sportspeople from Kingston, Jamaica
Sportspeople from Oakville, Ontario
Jamaican emigrants to Canada